Schawagrotis is a genus of moths of the family Noctuidae. These moths can be found almost in any part of the globe but they are particularly common in tropical regions.

External links
Natural History Museum Lepidoptera genus database

References

Noctuinae